Lee Ji-ha (born October 7, 1970) is a South Korean actress and model. She is known for her roles in dramas such as The Smile Has Left Your Eyes, My Unfamiliar Family, Sweet Home and Squid Game, the latter gaining her international fame. She also appeared in movies The Bros, The Handmaiden and Tabloid Truth.

Filmography

Television series

Film

Awards and nominations

References

External links
 
 

1970 births
Living people
21st-century South Korean actresses
South Korean female models
South Korean television actresses
South Korean film actresses